The post of Grand Imam of al-Azhar, or shaykh of al-Azhar, has been filled by a member of the ulema, the religious scholars, of Egypt. The position of Grand Imam is among the most prominent roles in Islam and is often considered to be the highest authority in Islamic jurisprudence. The Grand Imam of al-Azhar is the most prominent official religious role in Egypt. Prior to the establishment of the post under the Ottoman Empire, the holder of that position was named Mushrif then later a Nazir. Between 1860 and 1864 a board of scholars served the role as Grand Imam.

Several of the Grand Imams served multiple terms; each term is listed separately. The original sources give the year  based on the Islamic calendar, so the conversion to Gregorian years by later Western sources may not be precise.

List

Footnotes

References

Al-Azhar University
Lists of Islamic religious leaders
Lists of office-holders in Egypt
Muslim scholars of Islamic jurisprudence